Tiago Jorge da Silva Violas (born 27 March 1989) is a Portuguese volleyball player who plays for S.L. Benfica and the Portugal national team.

Honours
Benfica
Portuguese First Division: 2016–17, 2018–19
Portuguese Cup: 2017–18, 2018–19
Portuguese Super Cup: 2016, 2018, 2019

References

External links
 Profile at FIVB.com

1989 births
Living people
People from Ovar
Portuguese men's volleyball players
Place of birth missing (living people)
S.L. Benfica volleyball players
Jastrzębski Węgiel players
Sportspeople from Aveiro District